The Beatles Channel is a Sirius XM Radio channel focusing on the music of the Beatles. The channel debuted on May 18, 2017, and broadcasts on Sirius XM Radio channel 18.

The channel is described as follows:
The Beatles were the big bang of pop - they created the musical world we live in today. Now for the first time, the most popular band in history presents their own channel. All things Beatles, 24/8. All of their hits, album tracks, rarities & solo songs, along with the records that influenced them and music inspired by them. Plus, hear specials, interviews and exclusive hosted shows. It's the soundtrack of our world made by John, Paul, George and Ringo.

See also
 List of Sirius XM Radio channels

Notes

References

External links
 SiriusXM: The Beatles Channel

Sirius Satellite Radio channels
XM Satellite Radio channels
Sirius XM Radio channels
Radio stations established in 2017
Radio programmes about the Beatles